Thomas F. Campbell (August 26, 1897 – March 7, 1957) was an American businessman and politician from New York.

Life
He was born on August 26, 1897, in Amsterdam, Montgomery County, New York, the son of Detective Michael Campbell (died 1902). After the death of his father, the family removed to Schenectady. There he attended St. Joseph's School. He graduated from Niagara University, and in 1920 began to work for General Electric in Schenectady. In 1932, he became a funeral director.

He entered politics as a Republican. He was a member of the Board of Supervisors of Schenectady County from the 7th Ward of the City of Schenectady from 1931 to 1935; a member of the City Council of Schenectady from 1936 to 1944; and a member of the New York State Senate from 1945 until his death in 1957, sitting in the 165th, 166th, 167th, 168th, 169th, 170th and 171st New York State Legislatures.

On February 26, 1957, he underwent an operation of a brain tumor in Albany Hospital. He died unmarried on March 7, 1957, at his home at 1503 Union Street in Schenectady, New York.

Sources
 State Sen. Thomas F. Campbell, Native of Amsterdam, Dies at 59, After Surgery for Brain Tumor in the Evening Recorder, of Amsterdam, on March 8, 1957

1897 births
1957 deaths
People from Amsterdam, New York
Republican Party New York (state) state senators
Niagara University alumni
County legislators in New York (state)
Schenectady City Council members
20th-century American politicians